Ahuacatlán may refer to:

 Ahuacatlán, Nayarit, a municipal seat in the Mexican state of Nayarit
 Ahuacatlán, Puebla, a municipal seat in the Mexican state of Puebla
Ahuacatlán Municipality, Nayarit
Ahuacatlán Municipality, Puebla